Eastport Plaza is a shopping center located in Portland, Oregon, in the United States. It is anchored by Century 16 Theatres, LA Fitness, and Walmart. Originally an enclosed shopping mall, construction began on October 20, 1959, and was carried out by the Anderson–Westfall Construction Company. It was one of the biggest construction projects in the Pacific Northwest at the time and cost $5 million. It opened on October 27, 1960.

Former anchor stores included J. C. Penney, Mervyn's (which replaced Lipman's), Newberry's, Albertsons, Tower Records and G.I. Joe's. It largely became a dead mall in the 1990s, particularly after Mervyn's relocated to Clackamas Promenade in 1988, part of a flight of businesses and customers to the newer, larger suburban mall to Eastport's south on 82nd Avenue. The enclosed structure was demolished in 1996, replaced by the current open-air shopping plaza.

References

1960 establishments in Oregon
Lents, Portland, Oregon
Shopping centers in Portland, Oregon
Shopping malls established in 1960